The Mother Eagle (lit. "The Blood of the Pelican") is a Canadian docudrama film, directed by Denis Boivin and released in 2020. The film blends historical reenactments of the life of Marie of the Incarnation (Karen Elkin), an Ursuline nun in New France who was instrumental in the founding of the historically significant Ursuline monastery in Montreal, with a contemporary story in which she returns to earth in the 2010s to assist the contemporary nuns who are leaving the facility due to their advancing age.

The film's cast includes Louis Carrière, Karl-Patrice Dupuis, Marcel Godbout, Perrine Gruson, Marie-Ginette Guay, Pierre Lebeau, Raymond Lemieux, David Noël, Suzanne Pineau and Louise Portal.

The film had its theatrical premiere in October 2020, before opening commercially in March 2021.

It was a Prix Iris nominee for the Public Prize at the 23rd Quebec Cinema Awards in 2021.

References

External links

2020 films
2020 drama films
Canadian docudrama films
Quebec films
2020s French-language films
French-language Canadian films
2020s Canadian films